Zert can refer to:

 Žert, a novel by Milan Kundera
 The Zeroday Emergency Response Team (ZERT), a group of volunteer security researchers who produced emergency patches for zero day attack vulnerabilities in proprietary software